Isakovo is a rural locality (a village) in Chertkovskoye Rural Settlement, Selivanovsky District, Vladimir Oblast, Russia. The population was 19 as of 2010.

Geography 
Isakovo is located on the Kestromka River, 11 km north of Krasnaya Gorbatka (the district's administrative centre) by road. Voshchikha is the nearest rural locality.

References 

Rural localities in Selivanovsky District